The Tat language, also known as Caucasian Persian, Tat/Tati Persian, or Caucasian Tat, is a Southwestern Iranian language closely related to, but not fully mutually intelligible with Persian and spoken by the Tats in Azerbaijan and Russia. There is also an Iranian language called Judeo-Tat spoken by Jews of Caucasus.

General information
The Tats are an indigenous Iranian people in the Caucasus who trace their origin to the Sassanid-period migrants from Iran (ca. fifth century AD).

Tat is endangered, classified as "severely endangered" by UNESCO's Atlas of the World's Languages in Danger.  Most scholars divide Tat into two general varieties: Jewish and Muslim, with religious differences correlating with linguistic differences.

Another, almost extinct, variety of Tat is spoken by Christians of Armenian origin, who are called Armeno-Tats.

Dialects
Vladimir Minorsky mentions in the first edition of Encyclopaedia of Islam that like most Persian dialects, Tati is not very regular in its characteristics, and occupies a position between modern Persian and the Caspian dialects.  According to him, The Great Russian Encyclopedia of 1901 gives the number of Tati speakers in 1901 as 135,000.  In the 1930s, Minorsky estimated the number of Tati speakers to be 90,000 and the decrease to be the result of gradual Turkicization.

Variants
Aruskush-Daqqushchu
Lahyj
Balakhani
Devechi
Qyzyl Qazma
Qonaqkend
Absheron
Surakhani
Northern Tats
Malham
Quba

Speakers
According to the 1989 Soviet census, 30,000 Tats lived in the Soviet Union, of which 10,000 were in Azerbaijan. Not all likely speak Tati, and this does not include the more rural locations that were not reached by the census. It is vital to stress that the Tats are one of the most assimilated of Azerbaijan’s ethnic groups. This is particularly true for urban Tats. All of this makes it difficult to identify the true number of the Tat ethnic group.

The adults in most of the mountain and foothill communities reported they use Tat as their main language of interaction. They speak Tat with each other, but speak Azerbaijani with their children so that they will learn the language before beginning school. If the wife in the family is non-Tat speaking, however, the family is most likely to use Azerbaijani in the home. In the villages of Lahıc and Zǝyvǝ, women who marry in are reported to learn Tat.

Ethnic population
Research has demonstrated that the word “Tat” does not have an ethnic origin. This is the term the Turks used to denote the settled Iranian-speaking population of Azerbaijan. This is proven by the names some groups of the Tat population have given themselves. For example, the residents of the Apsheron settlements of Balakhany and Surakhany call themselves Pars, and those of the settlement of Lagich in the Ismailly district the Lohudj. It must be mentioned that in the 19th century, cattle herders called the seasonal workers from southern Azerbaijan Tat, although they were ethnic Turks.

Case study: Mǝlhǝm
The town of Mǝlhǝm is largely Tat. Mǝlhǝm lies 6 km north of Şamaxı town on the A12 road. An estimated 1,500 residents live in Mǝlhǝm, a number higher than five years ago. The increase in population is primarily due to an increase in birth rate. According to the mayor, while approximately 10–15% of residents go to Baku to study or work, most return. Ethnically, the village is made up entirely of Tats, with the exception of a handful of ethnic Azerbaijani brides.

Phonology  
The following information is of the dialect of Apsheron:

Consonants 

 Stop sounds /t, d/ are phonetically dental as [t̪, d̪]
 /ʒ/ is mainly heard from loanwords.
 Velar fricative sounds /x, ɣ/ can be heard in free variation as uvular fricative sounds [χ, ʁ].
 /k/ is heard as palatal [c] when preceding front vowels, and occurs as velar [k] elsewhere.
 Sounds /ʒ, d͡ʒ/ can also be heard as retroflex sounds [ʐ, d͡ʐ].

Vowels 

 A back-unrounded vowel /ɯ/, can also appear, but only as a result of Azeri loanwords.

Writing system
Tat was not written until 1935. Efforts are being made at preservation. "Since 1996, the Azerbaijani government has provided money for the development of minority languages, including Tat. Haciyev (personal communication) reports that Tat classes have been started in several schools in the Quba region using an alphabet based on the current Azerbaijani Latin alphabet."

Vocabulary

Linguistic migration
The prominence of the Tati language is directly related to migration. Additionally, most Tats in Azerbaijan live in the Apsheron zone, as well as the following districts: Khyzy, Divichi and Guba. The Tat people have been dispersed in northeast Azerbaijan. By their origin, the Tats are direct descendants of the Iranian-speaking population that migrated back in the era of the Sassanids to the Caspian coastal regions of Azerbaijan. Most of the Tats in Azerbaijan live in the Apsheron zone and the districts of Khyzy, Divichi, Guba and some others.

Tats and Azerbaijanis
Coexistence between Tats and Azerbaijanis have combined much of the two cultures. Azerbaijani has largely overtaken Tati, which has also sparked a takeover in the ethnic consciousness of the Tats. The Tats and Azerbaijanis have gained much in common both industrially and culturally and in everyday life from their centuries of co-existence. Here a significant role has been played by the Azerbaijani language, which since the 19th century has been virtually the second native tongue for the Tats. The wide use of Azerbaijani, though, has imposed some constraints on the Tat language, which had become the general language in rural areas. Significant changes have taken place in the ethnic consciousness of the Tats. Many of them consider themselves to be Azerbaijani and have largely lost the Tat language.

Linguistic policies in Azerbaijan
Azerbaijan has approached its linguistic policies in an interesting way. These policies include education in Tat. The development of a fundamentally new linguistic policy that reflected the country's ethnic minorities, again, which would have included the Tati people, is described by Latifa Mammadova as the following: "In the early post-Soviet years, Azerbaijan’s authorities faced the challenge of developing a fundamentally new concept of ethnic and linguistic policies, one that would be tactful toward the country’s ethnic minorities and mindful of the sensitivities of each. They started by elaborating a law on the protection of rights and freedoms of the country’s ethnic minorities in the area of culture. This document guaranteed fundamental rights for minority groups and individuals, including the right to receive education and publish press in their mother tongue. It also proclaimed some universal values of multicultural society, such as equality, partnership, tolerance, solidarity, and justice."

See also
Azerbaijan
Russia
Languages of Azerbaijan
Judeo-Tat
Tat people (Iran)
Tati language (Iran)

References

Further reading
Donald W. Stilo, “The Tati Language Group in the Sociolinguistic Context of Northwestern Iran an Transcaucasia,” Iranian Studies: Journal of the Society for Iranian Studies (IranS) 14 (1981).
Gernot L. Windfuhr, “Typological Notes on Pronominal Cases in Iranian Tati,” Bulletin of the Asia Institute 4 (1990).
Giles Authier, “New Strategies for Relative Clauses in Azeri an Apsheron Tat,” In Clause Linkage in Cross-Linguistic Perspective: Data-Drive Approaches to Cross-Clausal Syntax (Berlin: de Gruyter Mouton 2012).
John M. Clifton, “Colonialism, Nationalism and Language Vitality in Azerbaijan,” in Responses to Language Endangerment: In honor of Mickey Noonan. New Directions in Language Documentation and Language Revitalization, ed. Elena Mihas, Bernard Perley, Gabriel Rei-Doval, Kathleen Wheatley (Amsterdam: John Benjamins Publishing Company, 2013): 201–205.
John M. Clifton, “Do the Talysh and Tat Languages Have a Future in Azerbaijan?” SIL International & University of North Dakota.
A.A. Saegehi, “New Words from the Old Language of Arran, Shirvan an Azerbaijan,” Iranian Journal of Linguistics 17.1 (2002) 21–40.
Abbas Taheri, “Tati Dialect of Takistan,” Iranian Journal of Linguistics 9.2 (1992) 25–39.

External links

Language Map of Azerbaijan.
Endangered Languages Project, Muslim Tat
Tat Numeral System
100-word Swadesh list collected 2013 in Lahıc village

Persian dialects and varieties
Languages of Azerbaijan
Languages of Russia
Endangered Iranian languages
Southwestern Iranian languages
Persian language
Languages of the Caucasus
Tat people
Caspian languages